Micraneflus imbellis is a species of beetle in the family Cerambycidae, the only species in the genus Micraneflus.

References

Elaphidiini